Hum World is a Pakistani television channel airing in United States of America, Canada, and Australia / New Zealand. Although it launched in USA as regular HUM TV USA on Dish Network on 18 March 2010, it was removed in November 2012 on the platform due to JadooTV signing an contract with Hum TV where it would be on IPTV only (whereas many people consider JadooTV illegal). It was brought back in 2017. In Canada, Australia and New Zealand it launched in 2014. It airs all new shows from Hum TV and some old shows that didn't air in the 2012-2017 period it wasn't transmitted in the mainstream USA. It is one of the top rated South Asian networks in America, Canada, New Zealand. The logo has HUM on top with the normal logo in the middle, and WORLD written on the bottom (contains | HD next to the word for HD feed). The logo regularly rotates on the side, and has a glare effect on the logo.

Programming

Former shows    
This only counts the series that have aired on national satellite and cable; not in 2012-2017 on Jadoo.

 O Rangreza
 Alif Allah Aur Insaan
 Humsafar
 Zindagi Gulzar Hai
 Dil-e-Muztar
 Shehr-e-Zaat
 Mata-e-Jaan Hai Tu
 Bilqees Kaur
 Zard Mausam
 Maseeha
 Roshan Sitara
 Meray Dard Ko Jo Zuban Miley
 Badi Aapa
 Khoya Khoya Chand
 Kankar
 Aseerzadi
 Mujhe Khuda Pe Yaqeen Hai
 Ishq Mein Teray
 De Ijazat Jo Tu
 Bunty I Love You
 Gul-e-Rana
 Abro
 Dil-e-Beqarar
 Pakeeza
 Mann Mayal	
 Zara Yaad Kar
 Udaari
 Khwab Saraye	
 Jhoot	
 Dharkan  	
 Kathputli      	
 Deewana
 Laaj
 Hatheli 
 Bin Roye
 Sanam
 Saya-e-Dewar Bhi Nahi
 Sila
 Sang-e-Mar Mar
 Dil Banjaara
 Choti Si Zindagi
 Kuch Na Kaho
 Nazr-e-Bad
 Naatak
 Sammi
 Dil-e-Jaanam
 Phir Wohi Mohabbat
 Yeh Raha Dil
 Kitni Girhain Baaki Hain
 Mohabbat Khawab Safar
 Woh Aik Pal
 Adhi Gawahi
 Yaqeen Ka Safar
 Neelam Kinaray
 Gumrah
 Pagli
 Daldal
 Mein Maa Nahi Banna Chahti
 Tumhari Maryam
 Tau Dil Ka Kia Hua
 Gul-e-Rana
 Mohabat Subh Ka Sitara Hai
 Dar Si Jaathi Hai Sila
 Khamoshi
 Chand Pe Dastak
 Suno Chanda
 Muqaddas
 Teri Meri Kahaani
 Belapur Ki Dayaan
 Parchayee
 Mausam
 Maa Sadkay
 Mah-e-Tamaam
 Tabeer
 Jago Pakistan Jago
 Kisay Chahoon
 Kissey Apna Kahein
 Aik Larki Aam Si
 Tajdeed-e-Wafa
 Baandi
 Lamhay
 Tawaan
 Bisaat e Dil
 Band Khirkiyan

References 

Hum Network Limited
Urdu-language television channels